There are some articles regarding this topic:

 3rd millennium, up to the year 3000
 Timeline of the far future, events beyond the year 3000
 List of future astronomical events, for astronomical or calendric events

Fictional timelines 
 List of stories set in a future now in the past
 Timeline of Star Trek – science fiction television series, later expanded to other media.

future